Aaron Blake Tompkins (February 2, 1844–November 27, 1931) was a cavalry soldier who received the Medal of Honor while serving in the Union Army during the American Civil War.

Military career 
Blake joined the 1st New Jersey Volunteer Cavalry in December 1861.  He was serving as a Sergeant in Company G when he performed his act of bravery at the April 5, 1865 Battle of Sailor's Creek, Virginia.

His Medal was awarded to him on July 3, 1865, with a citation that reads "Charged into the enemy's ranks and captured a battle flag, having a horse shot under him and his cheeks and shoulders cut with a saber."

He died in Essex County, New Jersey, and was buried in Rosedale Cemetery, Orange, New Jersey.

Medal of Honor citation 
Rank and organization: Sergeant, Company G, 1st New Jersey Cavalry. Place and date: At Sailors Creek, Va., April 5, 1865. Entered service at: ------. Birth: Orange, Essex County, N.J. Date of issue: July 3, 1865.

Citation:

Charged into the enemy's ranks and captured a battle flag, having a horse shot under him and his cheeks and shoulders cut with a saber.

See also 

List of Medal of Honor recipients
List of American Civil War Medal of Honor recipients: T–Z

Notes

References 

Bilby, Joseph G. and Goble, William C., "Remember You Are Jerseymen: A Military History of Jersey's Troops in the Civil War", Longstreet House, Hightstown, June 1998. .
Lang, George, Collins, Raymond L., and White, Gerald, Medal of Honor recipients 1863-1994, 1995 
Stryker, William S., "Record of Officers and Men of New Jersey in the Civil War 1861-1865", Trenton, New Jersey, 1876.

1844 births
1931 deaths
People of New Jersey in the American Civil War
United States Army Medal of Honor recipients
Union Army soldiers
People from Orange, New Jersey
American Civil War recipients of the Medal of Honor